Otar Eranosyan (born 20 August 1993) is a Georgian professional boxer. As an amateur, he won silver medals at the 2014 European Union Amateur Boxing Championships and 2015 European Amateur Boxing Championships, as well as a bronze medal at the 2017 AIBA World Boxing Championships.

Amateur boxing career
Eranosyan medaled twice at the European Amateur Boxing Championships. He won his first silver medal in 2014, when he lost to David Oliver Joyce in the finals, and his second silver medal in 2015, when he lost to Joseph Cordina in the finals.

Competing as a lightweight in the 2017 AIBA World Boxing Championships, Eranosyan won the bronze medal. He lost a unanimous decision to the eventual silver medal winner Lazaro Alvarez.

Eranosyan participated in the 2019 European Games, competing as a lightweight. He earned his place in the semifinals with decision wins against Jordan Rodriguez and Javid Chalabiyev, but lost a decision in turn to the eventual silver medalist Gabil Mamedov.

Professional boxing career
Eranosyan made his professional debut against DeShawn Kennedy on 28 August 2020. He won the fight by a second-round knockout. Eranosyan amassed a 7–0 record during the next seven months, with five stoppage victories. Eranosyan had his first step-up in competition when he faced Jose Argel for the vacant WBA Continental Americas super featherweight title on 21 May 2021, on the undercard of the WBO NABO light flyweight title bout between champion Jonathan Gonzalez and challenger Armando Torres. Eranosyan justified his role as the favorite, and won the fight by unanimous decision. Two of the judges scored the fight 100–90 in his favor, while the third judge scored it 99–91 for him.

Eranosyan faced the 35-fight veteran Juan Carlos Pena on 13 August 2021, in the co-main event of a USA Telemundo broadcast card. He won the fight by a fourth-round technical knockout, stopping Pena 39 seconds into the round. Eranosyan next faced the 12–1 Alejandro Guerrero on 24 September 2021. The fight was scheduled for the undercard of the JaRico O'Quinn and Saul Sanchez bantamweight bout, which was broadcast by Showtime. He won the fight by unanimous decision, with scores of 79–73, 78–74 and 78–74.

Eranosyan was scheduled to face the undefeated Starling Castillo on 7 January 2022, on the undercard of Showtime's “ShoBox: The New Generation” series. He won the fight by a dominant unanimous decision, with two judges awarding him every single round of the fight, while the third judge scored only a single round for Castillo. Eranosyan knocked Castillo down twice in the opening round of the bout.

Professional boxing record

References

Living people
1993 births
People from Samtskhe–Javakheti
Georgian people of Armenian descent
Boxers from Georgia (country)
Super-featherweight boxers
Lightweight boxers
Boxers at the 2019 European Games
European Games medalists in boxing
AIBA World Boxing Championships medalists